Oologah is a town in Rogers County, Oklahoma, United States. Renowned humorist Will Rogers was born on a ranch two miles east of Oologah, although he usually claimed Claremore as his birthplace "because nobody but an Indian can pronounce 'Oologah.'"
There has been disagreement about the proper spelling for the town name. The official spelling is now Oologah. It was often spelled Oolagah before statehood, and this spelling appears on some old buildings.

History
In 1889, the Kansas and Arkansas Valley Railway (later, the St. Louis, Iron Mountain and Southern Railway, subsequently a part of the Missouri Pacific Railroad, and currently, the Union Pacific Railroad) laid tracks through the area and established a townsite named Oologah, Indian Territory. Oologah was named for Oologah (Dark Cloud), a Cherokee chief. The Encyclopedia of Oklahoma History and Culture says that the Oklahoma Federal Writers' Project claimed the name translates from the Cherokee as "red horse fish," while some other sources say that the name means "cloudy weather"  or just "clouds."The post office was opened May 25, 1891. 

Early in the 20th century, the town flourished because of agriculture, coal mining, and oil and gas production. However, these were hard hit during the Great Depression. The town's population declined from 324 in 1910 to 236 in 1940. The population had recovered to 299 in 1960. Construction of Oologah dam and lake in 1963, east of town, revitalized the town, which has continued to grow.

In 1963, the Army Corps of Engineers completed the first phase of Oologah Lake.

In 1991, an F4 tornado which was part of the Andover, Kansas tornado outbreak destroyed the north side of Oologah, including the town's school.

Geography
Oologah is located at  (36.443268, -95.709399).

Demographics
As of the census of 2020, there is 1,193 people and 435 households residing in the town. The population density is 955 people per square mile (368.72). The racial makeup of the town is 69.85% White, 0.85% African American, 14.65% Native American, 0.85% Asian, 0.94% from other races, and 12.86% from two or more races. Hispanic or Latino of any race were 2.39% of the population. 69.3% of the population was over 18.

As of the 2000 census, there were 342 households, out of which 42.1% had children under the age of 18 living with them, 52.0% were married couples living together, 18.4% had a female householder with no husband present, and 24.3% were non-families. 22.5% of all households were made up of individuals, and 9.6% had someone living alone who was 65 years of age or older. The average household size was 2.58 and the average family size was 3.03.

In the town, the population was spread out, with 31.6% under the age of 18, 8.6% from 18 to 24, 27.7% from 25 to 44, 22.1% from 45 to 64, and 10.0% who were 65 years of age or older. The median age was 33 years. For every 100 females, there were 89.9 males. For every 100 females age 18 and over, there were 84.1 males.

The median income for a household in the town was $33,977, and the median income for a family was $40,625. Males had a median income of $37,500 versus $25,000 for females. The per capita income for the town was $16,493. About 7.5% of families and 9.8% of the population were below the poverty line, including 14.7% of those under age 18 and 6.9% of those age 65 or over.

Education

Oologah-Talala Public Schools has a 4A sized high school. The Oologah Lower Elementary is an "Oklahoma A+" school, recognized as being one of seven schools statewide chosen for this honor.

The Oologah-Talala High School athletic program has gained the school recognition. In the 1990s, Oologah had the most successful class 3A football program in the state; an era that featured the Mustangs as class 3A State Champions in 1997 & 1998 and two Class 3A state runner-up finishes.

In March 2010, an outbreak of bacterial meningitis killed two students at Oologah-Talala Lower Elementary School.

Oologah High School Sports Championships

Baseball
1996 Class 4A State Champions
2005 Class 4A State Champions

Basketball
1965 Class B Boys Basketball State Champions
1994 Class 3A 5-on-5 Girls Basketball State Champions

Football
1997 Class 3A State Champions
1998 Class 3A State Champions

Softball
1988 Class 4A Fast Pitch State Champions
1989 Class 3A Fast Pitch State Champions
1992 Class 3A Fast Pitch State Champions
1993 Class 3A Fast Pitch State Champions
1998 Class 3A Fast Pitch State Champions
1999 Class 4A Fast Pitch State Champions
2012 Class 4A Fast Pitch State Champions

Volleyball
1961 State Champions
1965 State Champions

Source:

Notable residents
 Zach Bryan –  American country singer/songwriter
 Will Rogers – preeminent philanthropist, actor, humorist, philosopher, and political satirist of the early 1900s; born at Dog Iron Ranch just outside Oologah

References

External links
 
 The Oologah Lake Leader – A well-known local newspaper.
 Oologah Lake on Corps of Engineers website
 Oologah-Talala Public Schools website
 Chamber of Commerce website
 Oologah.com

Towns in Rogers County, Oklahoma
Towns in Oklahoma
Populated places established in 1889
Cherokee towns in Oklahoma